Hibbertia papillata is a species of flowering plant in the family Dilleniaceae and is endemic to the Fitzgerald River National Park in Western Australia. It is an erect shrub with crowded, linear, hairy leaves and yellow flowers usually with ten stamens, all on one side of, and curving over two hairy carpels.

Description
There are usually ten stamens arranged on one side of, and curving over two hairy carpels that each contain two ovules. Flowering occurs from September to October.

Taxonomy
Hibbertia papillata was first formally described in 2004 by Judith R. Wheeler in the journal Nuytsia from specimens she collected on the south-east slopes of East Mount Barren in 1986. The specific epithet (papillata) refers to the minute pimples on the upper surface of the leaves.

Distribution and habitat
This hibbertia is only known from the Fitzgerald River National Park where it grows in low heath on ridges and slopes.

Conservation status
Hibbertia papillata is classified as "Priority Two" by the Western Australian Government Department of Parks and Wildlife meaning that it is poorly known and from only one or a few locations.

See also
List of Hibbertia species

References

papillata
Flora of Western Australia
Plants described in 2004